Dorothy Bryant (1930–2017) was an American novelist, playwright, essayist and feminist writer.

Bryant was known for her mystical, feminist and fantastic novels and plays that traverse the space between the real world and her character's inner psyche or soul.  Her book The Kin of Ata Are Waiting for You was described by Alice Walker as "One of my favorite books in all the world."

Personal and professional life
Dorothy Bryant was born in San Francisco in 1930, second daughter of Joe and Giuditta Calvetti, both born in Balangero, a factory town near Turin, Italy, and brought to the United States as children. Bryant became the first in her family to graduate from college, and she earned her living teaching (high school and college) until 1976. She began writing in 1960 and published a dozen books of fiction and non-fiction. Her plays have been performed in the Bay Area and beyond.

Works

Fiction
Ella Price's Journal (1972, J. B. Lippincott, reprinted 1973 by Signet Books)
The Kin of Ata Are Waiting for You (1976)
Miss Giardino (1976)
The Garden of Eros (1979)
Prisoners (1980)
Killing Wonder (1981)
A Day in San Francisco (1983)
Confessions of Madame Psyche (1986) (American Book Award winner 1987)
The Test (1991)
Anita, Anita (1994)
The Berkeley Pit (2007)

Non-fiction
 Writing a Novel (1983)
 Myths to Lie By (1984)
 Literary Lynching: When Readers Censor Writers  (online)

Plays
 Dear Master (1991)
 Tea with Mister Hardy (1992)
 The Panel (1994)
 Posting for Gaugain (1997)
 The Trial of Cornelia Connelly (2003)
 Sad But Glorious Days (2003)
 Eros in Love (2006)

References

External links 
 

1930 births
2017 deaths
American feminist writers
American women dramatists and playwrights
American women essayists
American women novelists
American women short story writers
Writers from the San Francisco Bay Area
20th-century American dramatists and playwrights
20th-century American essayists
21st-century American essayists
20th-century American novelists
21st-century American novelists
20th-century American short story writers
21st-century American short story writers
20th-century American women writers
21st-century American women writers
American writers of Italian descent
American Book Award winners